Hugo Pietari "Heikki" Hallamaa (born Häyrén, 7 October 1867 – 1 March 1951) was a Finnish sports shooter, who competed at the 1908 Summer Olympics.

Olympics

Personal 

Born Häyrén, he finnicized his family name to Hallamaa on 23 June 1906.

He and Amanda Karolina Törnström had at least two children:
 Rakel Jalas, a member of the parliament. 
 Rafael Hallamaa, businessman, who was the father of the ceramist Liisa Hallamaa.

He was an owner of the Lahdentaka Mansion. Later he was a tycoon in Helsinki.

Sources

References

External links 
 

1867 births
1951 deaths
People from Priozersk
People from Viipuri Province (Grand Duchy of Finland)
Finnish male sport shooters
Olympic shooters of Finland
Shooters at the 1908 Summer Olympics